Rogelio Miranda Baldivia (1922 in La Paz – 13 August 2021 in La Paz) was a Bolivian general. He was also Bolivian Ambassador to the United Kingdom (1974–1978).

In 1970, Miranda lead a military coup against president Ovando, subsequently declaring himself as president over the junta that he was planning on installing. However, the revolt not long after by the troops under General Torres led to a merging of the two groups and the instatement of Torres as president instead.

References

1922 births
2021 deaths
Bolivian generals
Ambassadors of Bolivia to the United Kingdom
People from La Paz
Place of birth missing